Jerry Nqolo (born 23 July 1991) is a South African cricketer. He was included in the Border cricket team squad for the 2015 Africa T20 Cup. In August 2018, he was named in Border's squad for the 2018 Africa T20 Cup. In April 2021, he was named in Border's squad, ahead of the 2021–22 cricket season in South Africa.

References

External links
 

1991 births
Living people
South African cricketers
Border cricketers
People from Raymond Mhlaba Local Municipality
Warriors cricketers